is a passenger railway station in located in the city of Iga,  Mie Prefecture, Japan, operated by the private railway operator Iga Railway.

Lines
Uenoshi Station is served by the Iga Line, and is located 3.9 rail kilometers from the starting point of the line at Iga-Ueno Station.

Station layout
The station consists of a single island platform connected to a wooden 3-story station building by a level crossing. The station building dates from the original construction of the station and received protection by the national government as a Registered Tangible Cultural Property in 2021.

Platforms

Adjacent stations

History
Through a series of mergers, the Iga Line became part of the Kintetsu network by June 1, 1944, but was spun out as an independent company in October 2007. The station was renamed to its present name on September 1, 1941. Freight operations were discontinued from October 1973.

Passenger statistics
In fiscal 2019, the station was used by an average of 838 passengers daily (boarding passengers only).

Surrounding area
 Haiseiden
 Iga City Office
 IGA Railway Headquarters
 Iga Ueno Castle
 Ueno Post Office
 Ueno Sangyōkaikan (Bus stop)

See also
List of railway stations in Japan

References

External links

  

Railway stations in Japan opened in 1916
Railway stations in Mie Prefecture
Iga, Mie
Registered Tangible Cultural Properties